Fairplay is an unincorporated community in Jefferson County, in the U.S. state of Ohio.

History
Fairplay was originally called Bloomfield Station. A post office called Fair Play was established in 1860, and remained in operation until 1918.

References

Unincorporated communities in Jefferson County, Ohio
Unincorporated communities in Ohio